Bolivia at the Olympics made its debut appearances at the tenth edition of the Summer Olympic Games (1936) and the thirteenth edition of the Winter Olympic Games (1956), both under the auspices of the Bolivian Olympic Committee almost since its inception in 1932, and acceptance by the International Olympic Committee in 1936. Regular participation at the Summer Games followed at the fifteenth edition (1964) except at the nineteenth edition during the 1980 Summer Olympics boycott.

Bolivia has yet to win an Olympic medal, a distinction shared with no other South American nation. Their best result at team event placing was in Athletics at the twenty-second edition of the Summer Olympics (1992). The women’s 4x400m relay team finished fourteenth out of fifteen teams. The best result of individual event placing was in Athletics at the twenty-eighth edition of the Summer Olympics (2016). In the Women’s 20km Walk, Ángela Castro finished at eighteenth place out of seventy-four athletes.

Medal tables

Medals by Summer Games

Medals by Winter Games

See also
 List of flag bearers for Bolivia at the Olympics
 :Category:Olympic competitors for Bolivia
 Tropical nations at the Winter Olympics

References

External links